Rinaldi is a surname. Notable people with the surname include:

Alessandro Rinaldi (painter) (born 1839), Cremonese historic painter
Alessandro Rinaldi (footballer) (born 1974), Italian soccer player
Andrea Rinaldi (2000–2020), Italian footballer
Ann Rinaldi (1934–2021), American young adult fiction author
Antonella Rinaldi (born 1954), Italian actress and voice actress
Antonio Rinaldi (architect) (с. 1710–1794), Italian architect
Antonio Maria Rinaldi (born 1955), Italian economist and politician
Bianca Rinaldi (born 1974), Brazilian actress 
Cesare Rinaldi (1559–1636), Italian poet
Claudio Rinaldi (painter) (1852–after 1909), Italian painter
Claudio Rinaldi (speed skater) (born 1987), Italian short-track speed-skater
Deborah Salvatori Rinaldi (born 1991), Italian footballer
Domenico Rinaldi (born 1959), Italian diver 
Douglas Rinaldi (born 1979), Brazilian footballer
François Rinaldi (1924-2002), French rugby league footballer
Gabriel Rinaldi (born 1970), Argentine football manager and former player
Giovanni Rinaldi Montorio (fl. 1538–1546), Roman Catholic prelate who served as Bishop of Narni
Jessica Rinaldi, Pulitzer Prize winning photojournalist
Jordan Rinaldi (born 1987), American mixed martial artist 
Julien Rinaldi (born 1979), French rugby player
Juno Rinaldi (born 1977), Canadian actress
Kathy Rinaldi (born 1967), American tennis player
Lou Rinaldi (born 1947), Canadian politician
Margherita Rinaldi (born 1935), Italian soprano
Matt Rinaldi (born 1975), Texas lawyer and state representative
Michael Ruben Rinaldi (born 1995), Italian motorcycle racer
Michele Rinaldi (footballer, born 1987), Italian soccer player
Nicholas Rinaldi (born 1934), American poet and novelist
Odorico Raynaldi (1595–1671), Italian Catholic historian 
Redo Rinaldi (born 1994), Indonesian footballer
Rich Rinaldi (born 1949), American basketball player
Rudy Rinaldi (born 1993), Monegasque bobsledder
Susana Rinaldi (born 1935), Argentine tango singer
Tom Rinaldi, American sports commentator

See also
Rinaldo (disambiguation)

Italian-language surnames
Patronymic surnames
Surnames of Italian origin